The thirteenth edition of the Men's Football Tournament (soccer) at the Pan American Games was held in Winnipeg, Manitoba, Canada from July 23 to August 7, 1999. Since this edition, U-23 teams competed, with title defender Argentina missing. Mexico won their 3rd. gold medal after beating Honduras 3–1 in the final.

For the first time there was also a Women's Football Tournament included in the Pan Am Games.

Group stage

Group A

 Mexico and Canada qualified to semifinals.

Group B

 Honduras and USA qualified to semifinals.

Knockout stage

Semi finals

Bronze medal match

Gold Medal match

Medalists

Goalscorers

References

Football at the 1999 Pan American Games